This is a list of Japanese comedians—known in Japanese as  ,  , or simply  —and their group names. This page uses the word "comedian" in its broadest possible sense. For more information on modern Japanese comedy, see owarai. Names on this page are listed by the year of their debut or entrance into the entertainment industry. The list covers only notable comedians. Comedy groups that were formed years after the members debut will not be listed as the members will be listed individually.

For a list of Japanese comedians by alphabetical order, see List of Japanese comedians

1951

1952

1954

1962

1963

1964

1965

1966

1968

1971

1972

1973

1974

1975

1977

1979

1980

1981

1982

1983

1984

1985 
 
 
  [Current - 130R]
  [Current - 130R]

1986

1987

1988 
 
 
 
 
 
 
 
 
 
 
 
 
  [Actress debut, comedian debut is 2006]

1989

First Gen 
 
 
 
 
 
 
  [Current - ]

Second Gen 
 FUJIWARA
 
 
 
 
 
 
 
 
 
  [Current - ]

1990 
 
 
 
 

 
 
 
 
 
 TKO
 
 
 
 
 
  [Current - ]
  [Current - ]
  [Current - ]
 X-GUN

1991 
 
 
 
 
 
  [Current - ]
 
  [Current - ]
  [Current - ]

1992

1993 
 
  [Current - ]
 Cowcow

1994 
 
 
 
 
  [Current - ]
 

  [Current - ]
 TIM
 
 
 
 
 
 
 
 
 
 
 
  [Current - ]
 
 
 
  [Current - ]
  [Current - ]
 
 
 
 
 
 
 
 
 
 
  [Current - ]

1995 
 
 
 
 
 
 
 
  [Current - ]
  [Current - ]
  [Current - ]
  [Current - ]
  [Current - ]
 
 
 
 
 
 
 
  [Current - ]
  [Current - ]
 
  [Current - ]
 
 
 
  [Current - ]
 
  [Current - ]

1996 
 
 
 
 
 
 
 
 
 
 
 
 
 
 
 
 
  [Current - ]
  [Current - ]

1997 
 AMEMIYA
  [Current - ]
 
 

 
 
 
 
  [Current - ]

1998 
  [Current - ]
  [Current - ]
 
 
 
 
 
  [Current - ]
 
 
 
 
 
 
 
 
 
 
 
 
 
  [Current - ]
  [Current - ]

See also
List of Japanese celebrities
List of Japanese people
List of Japanese comedians

References 

Comedians
Japanese